The 1907 Chicago Cubs season was the 36th season of the Chicago Cubs franchise, the 32nd in the National League and the 15th at West Side Park. It was the first season that the Chicago Cubs became the franchise's name officially. The team finished in first place in the National League with a record of 107–45, 17 games ahead of the Pittsburgh Pirates. It was their second straight NL pennant. The Cubs faced the Detroit Tigers in the 1907 World Series, which they won four games to none (with one tie) for their first World Series victory.

Regular season

Season standings

Record vs. opponents

Roster

Player stats

Batting

Starters by position 
Note: Pos = Position; G = Games played; AB = At bats; H = Hits; Avg. = Batting average; HR = Home runs; RBI = Runs batted in

Other batters 
Note: G = Games played; AB = At bats; H = Hits; Avg. = Batting average; HR = Home runs; RBI = Runs batted in

Pitching

Starting pitchers 
Note: G = Games pitched; IP = Innings pitched; W = Wins; L = Losses; ERA = Earned run average; SO = Strikeouts

Other pitchers 
Note: G = Games pitched; IP = Innings pitched; W = Wins; L = Losses; ERA = Earned run average; SO = Strikeouts

1907 World Series 

NL Chicago Cubs (4) vs AL Detroit Tigers (0)

References 
1907 Chicago Cubs season at Baseball Reference

Chicago Cubs seasons
National League champion seasons
World Series champion seasons
Chicago Cubs season
Chicago Cubs